As of March 2023, LATAM Brasil (formerly TAM Linhas Aéreas) operates scheduled services to the destinations below. The list includes destinations formerly served by its subsidiaries, Pantanal Linhas Aéreas and TAM Paraguay:

Map

Destinations

Additionally, LATAM Brasil offers for its passengers free dedicated bus transfers between Guarulhos and Congonhas airports in São Paulo at regular times.

References

Destinations
Lists of airline destinations